Bradford-on-Avon (sometimes Bradford on Avon or Bradford upon Avon) is a town and civil parish in west Wiltshire, England, near the border with Somerset, which had a population of 9,402 at the 2011 census. The town's canal, historic buildings, shops, pubs and restaurants make it popular with tourists.

The history of the town can be traced back to Roman origins. It has several buildings dating from the 17th century, when the town grew due to the thriving English woollen textile industry.

Geography 
The local area around Bath provides the Jurassic limestone known as Bath stone, from which the older buildings are constructed. The River Avon (the Bristol Avon) runs through the town. The larger town of Trowbridge is nearby to the southeast.

The town includes the suburbs of Bearfield and Woolley; the parish includes the hamlets of Widbrook and Woolley Green.

The Western Wiltshire Green Belt, which forms the eastern extent of the Avon Green Belt, completely surrounds Bradford-on-Avon. It helps to maintain the setting and preserve the character of the town by maintaining separation from nearby settlements such as Trowbridge, Winsley, and Westwood.

History 
The earliest evidence of habitation is fragments of Roman settlements above the town. In particular, archaeological digs have revealed the remains of a large Roman villa with a well-preserved mosaic on the playing fields of St Laurence School. The centre of the town grew up around the ford across the river Avon, hence the origin of the town's name ("Broad-Ford"). This was supplemented in Norman times by the stone bridge that still stands today. The Norman side is upstream, and has pointed arches; the newer side has curved arches. The Town Bridge and Chapel is a grade I listed building. It was originally a packhorse bridge, but widened in the 17th century by rebuilding the western side. On 2 July 1643 the town was the site of a skirmish in the English Civil War, when Royalists seized control of the bridge on their way to the Battle of Lansdowne.

On the bridge stands a small building which was originally a chapel but was later used as a town lock-up. The weathervane on top takes the form of a gudgeon (an early Christian symbol), hence the local saying "under the fish and over the water".

The river provided power for the wool mills that gave the town its wealth. The town has 17th-century buildings dating from the most successful period of the local textile industry. The best examples of weavers' cottages are on Newtown, Middle Rank and Tory Terraces. Daniel Defoe visited Bradford-on-Avon in the early 18th century and commented: "They told me at Bradford that it was no extra-ordinary thing to have clothiers in that country worth, from ten thousand, to forty thousand pounds a man [equivalent to £1.3M to £5.3M in 2007], and many of the great families, who now pass for gentry in those counties, have been originally raised from, and built up by this truly noble manufacture."

With improving mechanisation in textile manufacture during the Industrial Revolution, the wool weaving industry moved from cottages to purpose-built woollen mills adjacent to the river, where they used water and steam to power the looms. Around thirty such mills were built in Bradford-on-Avon alone, and these prospered further until the English woollen industry shifted its centre of power to Yorkshire in the late 19th century. The last local mill closed in 1905. Many have since stood empty and some became derelict.

A notable feature of Bradford-on-Avon is the large Grade II* listed tithe barn, known as the Saxon Tithe Barn, 180 feet long and 30 feet wide, which was constructed in the 14th century and is now part of Barton Farm Country Park. The barn was used for collecting taxes, in the form of goods, to fund the church.

There are several notable buildings in and around the town centre. Many of the old textile factories have been converted into modern flats and apartments; however, few of the buildings are still used today in their original roles. One of the few is The Swan, a public house and hotel set in the centre of town; the building is 17th century and retains many original features, in particular the stone flag floors. Records show that there has been a public house on the same site since the 1500s. The Hall, on the eastern edge of the town, is a Jacobean mansion built for John Hall, a wealthy mill-owner, in about 1610. It was bought by Stephen Moulton in 1848, and is now managed by the Alex Moulton Charitable Trust.

In 1998 the Wiltshire Music Centre was opened in Bradford-on-Avon, on the grounds of St Laurence School. In 2000, the Millennium sculpture nicknamed "Millie" was unveiled.

On 8 October 2003, Bradford-on-Avon was granted Fairtrade Town status.

Religious sites

Early church 

The Saxon church dedicated to Saint Laurence may have been founded by Saint Aldhelm around 705, and could have been a temporary burial site for King Edward the Martyr. It was rediscovered by the Anglican priest, antiquarian and author William Jones in 1856, having been used for secular purposes (apparently becoming a house, a school and part of a factory).

It is suggested that some of the building, containing the blind arcades at a higher level, may belong to a later period while a leaflet available at the church in  February 2012  seems to prefer the period 950–1050 for the whole building. The elaborate ornamentation of the exterior consists of pilaster-strips, a broad frieze of two plain string-courses between which is a blind arcade of round-headed arches whose short vertical pilasters have trapezoidal capitals and bases, while on the eastern gable and the corners adjacent there is a series of mouldings as vertical triple semicylinders.

Inside the church, high in the wall above a small chancel arch, are the carved figures of two flying angels, the right-hand figure reportedly "intended to be clothed in transparent drapery ... the legs from the knee downward are depicted as showing through the transparent robe" which is referred to as a "quaint fancy".

Others 

In addition to the Saxon church, the town has two Church of England churches, two Baptist chapels, a United Church (Methodist and United Reformed Church), a free nonconformist church, a community church, a Quaker (Society of Friends) meeting house and a Roman Catholic church.

Holy Trinity Church is the original parish church, and stands near the town centre by the river. The Grade I listed building is Norman in origin, and it is possible that the chancel was built over the remains of an older church. Several chapels were added on the north side, and the wall in between was later opened up so that the chapels now form the north aisle. A squint, or hagioscope, near the altar is claimed to be England's longest. The tower and spire was built around 1480, replacing an older one, and the south wall was largely rebuilt in the 19th century. The church has a ring of eight bells, with the tenor (heaviest bell) weighing .

The other Anglican church, Christ Church, is entirely a Victorian construction. The Catholic church, dedicated to St. Thomas More, occupies a Grade II listed building, dating from 1854, that used to be the town hall.

There is also a Buddhist monastery in the town, under the auspices of the Aukana Trust; it comprises a monastic building each for men and for women, and a meditation hall. There are also workshops, gardens and a library, and the elegant buildings look down upon the town from a hill. The monastery practises the Theravadin tradition of Buddhism, and offers opportunities for both full-time residential and part-time practise and study.

Economy 

Bradford-on-Avon was the site of an early factory for rubber products, established at Kingston Mill by Stephen Moulton in 1848 and later named George Spencer, Moulton and Co. The company was acquired by Avon Rubber, a large manufacturer of rubber products for the automotive and other industries, and production continued until 1993. Today, the town is the headquarters of the Alex Moulton bicycle company and has several other small-scale manufacturing enterprises.

The town's main business is shopping, tourism and day-to-day servicing of a population largely made up of families, commuters and the retired.

The town has one mid-sized supermarket, Sainsbury's, on the Elms Cross industrial estate, a short walk from the canal lock, and five convenience stores. Local consumers founded Bradford-on-Avon Co-operative Society in 1861, which, in the 1960s, united with other consumer co-operatives in the district to merge with a national business. A mini outdoor shopping centre of independent shops, Weavers Walk, which describes itself as an "ethical trading centre", is in the town centre.

The town is an increasingly popular location for films, television adaptations and more; it has played host to Wolf Hall, Creation (a 2009 film about the life of Darwin), Robin of Sherwood and a 1972 film adaptation of The Canterbury Tales. In 2016, The White Princess TV series was filmed in the area.

Transport

Bradford-on-Avon is on the A363 Trowbridge to Bath road, which runs through the town from south to north, and crossed over by the B3109 linking Bradford-on-Avon with Melksham and Frome. All other road routes are minor, affording access to local settlements. Bradford-on-Avon is about 15 miles from junction 18 of the M4 motorway at Bath and the same distance from junction 17 at Chippenham.

Bradford-on-Avon railway station is on what is now the Heart of Wessex Line. It is served by Great Western Railway and South Western Railway services to Bath Spa, Bristol Temple Meads, Cardiff Central, Weymouth, Portsmouth Harbour and London Waterloo. The line opened in the mid-19th century and was built by the original Great Western Railway.

Running parallel to the railway through the town is the Kennet and Avon Canal. The use of this canal declined as the railways grew but it was restored to full working order during the 1960s, 1970s and 1980s. The canal provides a link through to the Avon at Bath in the west, and the Thames at Reading in the east.

Governance 
Bradford-on-Avon civil parish elects a town council with twelve members: six for the North ward and six for the South ward. From 2017 to 2021, the council consisted of seven councillors from the Ideal Bradford party platform, two independent councillors and three Liberal Democrat councillors. After the May 2021 elections, there were seven Liberal Democrat and five Ideal Bradford councillors. 

The town council provides an increasing range of services in the town, building on its historically mostly consultative and ceremonial role. These include provision of youth services, management of significant and growing areas of green space and town facilities, and management of several premises within the town. Its chairman has the title of Mayor of Bradford. The Town Council declared a climate emergency in March 2019 and has committed to becoming carbon neutral by 2030.  

Statutory local government functions (including schools, roads, social services, emergency planning, leisure services, development control, and waste disposal) are carried out by Wiltshire Council, a unitary authority.

Since 2010, Bradford-on-Avon has been part of the Chippenham parliamentary constituency.

Education
The town has a secondary school, St Laurence School, founded in 1980 as a result of the merger of Fitzmaurice Grammar School and Trinity Secondary Modern school. There are two primary schools: in the north of the town is Christ Church CofE (VC) Primary School, established as a National school in 1848 and on its present site since 1956, and in the south is Fitzmaurice Primary School, opened in 1928 as Bradford on Avon Council Junior Mixed and Infants' School.

Sport and leisure
Bradford-on-Avon has a non-League football club, Bradford Town F.C., who play at the Sports and Social Club on Trowbridge Road. In addition to a bowls club, tennis courts and a swimming pool, there is also the Bradford-on-Avon Rowing Club, catering for rowing and canoeing from their base opposite Barton Farm country park. Bradford on Avon rugby club, whose first team played in Dorset & Wilts 1 North in 2019–20, have their ground at Winsley, just west of the town.

Wiltshire Music Centre is a purpose-built, 300-seat concert hall within the grounds of St Laurence School that attracts internationally renowned musicians.

Notable people
Only notable people with entries on Wikipedia have been included. Their birth or residence has been verified by citations.

Historical figures

Diplomats
Donald Maitland, senior diplomat, lived in Bradford-on-Avon.
John Methuen was born in Bradford-on-Avon, as was his son Sir Paul Methuen. They were successively British Ambassadors to Portugal.

Sportspeople
Edgar Ford, cricketer, was born in Bradford-on-Avon.

Writers and artists
Eric Derwent Walrond, Afro-Caribbean Harlem Renaissance writer and journalist, lived from 1939 to 1952 at 9 Ivy Terrace, Bradford-on-Avon.
E. H. Young, novelist, children's writer and mountaineer, lived in Bradford-on-Avon.

Others
Shadrack Byfield, War of 1812 infantryman and memoirist, was born in Woolley, Bradford-on-Avon.
Alex Moulton, engineer and inventor, lived at The Hall, Bradford-on-Avon.
Hugh Scully, television presenter, was born in Bradford-on-Avon.

Living people

Sportspeople
Hannah Brown, canoeist, lives in Bradford-on-Avon.
Jazmin Carlin, Olympic medallist in swimming, lived in Bradford-on-Avon while training at the University of Bath.
Will Carling, rugby union player, was born in Bradford-on-Avon.
David Constant, Test cricket umpire, was born in Bradford-on-Avon.
Phil de Glanville, rugby union player, has lived in Bradford-on-Avon.
Paddy Edwards, cricketer, was born in Bradford-on-Avon.
Ed McKeever, Olympic canoeing champion, lives in Bradford-on-Avon.
Lewis Moody, rugby union player, lives in Bradford-on-Avon.
Rob Newman, footballer, and later football manager, was born in Bradford-on-Avon.
Andy Pearce, footballer, was born in Bradford-on-Avon.
Fitzroy Simpson, footballer, was born in Bradford-on-Avon.

Writers and artists
Paul Emsley, artist, lives in Bradford-on-Avon.
Simon R. Green, science-fiction/fantasy author, was born in Bradford-on-Avon.
Stephen Volk, screenwriter, lives in Bradford-on-Avon.

Others
Peter Hammill, singer-songwriter, lives in Bradford-on-Avon.
Jonathan Newth, stage and television actor, lives in Bradford-on-Avon.

Twin towns

Bradford-on-Avon is twinned with:
Sully-sur-Loire, France
Norden, Germany

References

External links 

Bradford on Avon Town Council
Explore BOA, Official Visitor Information Centre

Historic Bradford-on-Avon photos at BBC Wiltshire
Six English Towns: Bradford-on-Avon – A 35-minute BBC TV programme made in 1981 examining Bradford-on-Avon's Georgian buildings and architecture
Day Out: Bradford-on-Avon – A 30-minute BBC TV programme made in 1978 of a day spent exploring Bradford-on-Avon

 
Civil parishes in Wiltshire
Kennet and Avon Canal
Towns in Wiltshire